Kelwyn Sole (born 1951) is a South African poet and academic.

Sole was graduated with honours in English from the University of the Witwatersrand and following that, he was awarded an MA degree by the University of London’s School of Oriental and African Studies.

Reluctant to return to apartheid South Africa, Sole initially taught in Kanye, Botswana, before returning to South Africa to co-edit the literary journal, Donga. After stints in Windhoek and Johannesburg, where he completed a PhD in on the subject of the South African Black Consciousness Movement of the 1970s, Sole was appointed in 1987 by the University of Cape Town where, as of 2015, he is the chair of English Literature.

He has published numerous poetry anthologies and has won a number of literary awards.

Poetry 
The Blood of Our Silence, Ravan, Johannesburg, 1988
Projections in the Past Tense, Ravan, Johannesburg, 1992
Love That is Night, Gecko, Durban, 1998
Mirror and Water Gazing, Gecko, Durban, 2001
Land Dreaming, University of Kwazulu-Natal Press, Pietermaritzburg, 2006
 "Absent Tongues", Hands-On Books, Cape Town, 2012
Walking, Falling, Deep South, 2017

Awards 
 2020: DALRO Award (co-winner) for Poetry
 2018: South African Literary Award (SALA) for Poetry
 2012: Thomas Pringle Award for Poetry
 2001: University of Cape Town (Faculty of Humanities) Merit Award
 1999: International Merit Award, Poetry 1999 Competition, Atlanta Review
 1998: Thomas Pringle Award for Best Literary Article, English Academy of Southern Africa
 1994: Sydney Clouts Prize for Poetry
 1991: Hugh MacDiarmid Prize
 1989: Olive Schreiner Prize for Poetry

References 

1951 births
South African poets
Academic staff of the University of Cape Town
20th-century poets
Living people
University of the Witwatersrand alumni
Alumni of SOAS University of London